Kris Siddiqi is a Canadian actor and comedian. He is most noted as the co-creator and co-star with Nigel Downer of the web series Bit Playas, for which they won the Canadian Screen Award for Best Writing in a Web Program or Series at the 9th Canadian Screen Awards in 2021. He was also a nominee for Best Lead Performance in a Web Program or Series.

He is an alumnus of The Second City's Toronto troupe. In 2020 he participated in Mass Hysterical: A Comedic Cantata, a webcast collaboration between Second City alumni and the Toronto Symphony Orchestra which presented a comedic history of the use of classical and liturgical music in the church.

References

External links

21st-century Canadian male actors
21st-century Canadian comedians
Canadian male television actors
Canadian male film actors
Canadian male stage actors
Canadian male web series actors
Canadian male comedians
Canadian sketch comedians
Canadian people of Pakistani descent
Living people
Year of birth missing (living people)
Canadian Screen Award winners
Canadian Comedy Award winners